The Baghdad governorate election of 2013 was held on 20 April 2013 alongside elections for all other governorates outside Iraqi Kurdistan, Kirkuk, Anbar, and Nineveh.

Results 

|- style="background-color:#E9E9E9"
!align="left" colspan=2 valign=top|Party/Coalition!! Allied national parties !! Leader !!Seats !! Change !!Votes
|-
|bgcolor="#FF0000"|
|align=left|State of Law Coalition || ||Nouri Al-Maliki|| 20 || 8 || 569,178
|-
|bgcolor="#0D4E76"|
|align=left|Muttahidoon ||align=left| ||Usama al-Nujayfi || 7 || 7 || 183,716
|-
|bgcolor="#009933"|
|align=left|Citizens Alliance ||align=left| || Ammar al-Hakim|| 6 || 3 || 163,022
|-
|bgcolor="#000000"|
|align=left|Liberal Coalition|| ||Muqtada al-Sadr|| 5 || - || 137,808
|-
|bgcolor="#098DCD"|
|align=left|Al Iraqia National and United Coalition || || || 3 || 2 || 80,066
|-
|
|align=left|National Independent Elite Movement || || || 3 || 3 || 78,429
|-
|bgcolor="#00009F"|
|align=left|Arabian Al Iraqia || || Saleh al-Mutlaq || 3 || 1 || 70,644
|-
|
|align=left|Citizenship State Bloc|| || || 2 || 2 || 48,605
|-
|
|align=left|National Partnership Gathering || || || 1 || 1 || 31,889
|-
|bgcolor="#286F42"|
|align=left|Islamic Dawa Party - Iraq Organization|| || || 1 || 1 || 24,339
|-
|
|align=left|Iraqi Justice and Democracy Alliance || || || 1 || 1 || 23,388
|-
|
|align=left|Free Iraqi Coalition || || || 1 || 1 || 15,957
|-
|bgcolor="#F6BE22"|
|align=left|Iraq's Benevolence and Generosity List|| || || 1 || 1 || 15,162
|-
|
|align=left|People's Will || || || || || 10,595
|-
|
|align=left|New Dawn Bloc || || || || || 10,559
|-
|
|align=left|Urban Civil Tribes Gathering || || || || || 8,966
|-
|bgcolor="#CCFF33"|
|align=left|Feylis Kurds Brotherhood ListKurdish Minority seat || || || 1 || || 8,675
|-
|
|align=left|Iraqi Civil State Coalition || || || || || 7,567
|-
|
|align=left|Civilians Are Coming Coalition || || || || || 7,209
|-
|
|align=left|Iraq's Integrity Gathering || || || || || 6,834
|-
|
|align=left|Arabs’ Frontier || || || || || 6,330
|-
|
|align=left|Iraq's Advocates for State Support || || || || || 5,594
|-
|
|align=left|National Flag Gathering || || || || || 5,346
|-
|
|align=left|Iraq Cadres Bloc || || || || || 5,292
|-
|
|align=left|National Moderation Front || || || || || 4,463
|-
|bgcolor="#DDDDDD"|
|align=left|Hajj Hamid Ibrahim Abdul Karim ||align=left|Independent || || || || 4,443
|-
|
|align=left|National Tribal Movement in Iraq || || || || || 4,127
|-
|
|align=left|Islamic Advocates’ Party || || || || || 3,246
|-
|
|align=left|Equitable State Movement || || || || || 2,922
|-
|bgcolor="#DDDDDD"|
|align=left|Haydar Kathem Makawi ||align=left|Independent || || || || 2,903
|-
|
|align=left|The Iraqi Conservative Secretaries’ Party Future List || || || || || 2,881
|-
|
|align=left|Iraq's Party for Freedom Nabil Al Aaraji || || || || || 2,543
|-
|
|align=left|Baghdad’s Image || || || || || 2,208
|-
|
|align=left|Law Advocate Knights' Bloc || || || || || 1,999
|-
|
|align=left|Independent Iraqi Qualifications Gathering || || || || || 1,954
|-
|
|align=left|Baghdad Turkmen listTurkmen Minority seat || || || 1 || || 1,947
|-
|
|align=left|Chaldean Syriac Assyrian Gathering CoalitionChristian Minority seat || || || 1 || || 1,513
|-
|
|align=left|The Advocate's Party || || || || || 1,179
|-
|
|align=left|United National Christian Assembly || || || || || 1,066
|-
|
|align=left|Feylis Kurds Pledge Bloc || || || || || 1,032
|-
|bgcolor="#DDDDDD"|
|align=left|Raed Jabar SalehSabian Minority seat||align=left|Independent || || 1 || || 781
|-
|
|align=left|Iraqi Authentic Renaissance Movement || || || || || 692
|-
|
|align=left|Dakhel Yussef Aamara || || || || || 630
|-
|colspan=4 align=left|Total || 58 || 1 || 1,567,699
|-
|colspan=7 align=left|Sources: ISW, al-Sumaria - Baghdad Coalitions, IHEC Baghdad Results

References 

2013 Iraqi governorate elections
Baghdad Governorate